The Portugal men's national field hockey team represents Portugal in men's international field hockey and is controlled by the Portuguese Hockey Federation, the governing body for field hockey in Portugal.

Competitive record

European Championships

Hockey World League and FIH Series

See also
Portugal women's national field hockey team

References

External links
 Official website

European men's national field hockey teams
Field hockey
National team
Men's sport in Portugal